Popocatépetl is an active stratovolcano located in the states of Puebla, Morelos, and Mexico in central Mexico. It lies in the eastern half of the Trans-Mexican volcanic belt.

It is linked to the twin volcano of Iztaccihuatl to the north by the high saddle known as the "Paso de Cortés". Izta-Popo Zoquiapan National Park, wherein the two volcanoes are located, is named after them.
 
Until recently, the volcano was one of three tall peaks in Mexico to contain glaciers, the others being Iztaccihuatl and Pico de Orizaba. In the 1990s, the glaciers such as Glaciar Norte (North Glacier) greatly decreased in size, partly due to warmer temperatures but largely due to increased volcanic activity. By early 2001, Popocatépetl's glaciers were gone; ice remained on the volcano, but no longer displayed the characteristic features of glaciers such as crevasses.

Lava erupting from Popocatépetl has historically been predominantly andesitic, but it has also erupted large volumes of dacite. Magma produced in the current cycle of activity tends to be a mixture of the two with the andesites being rich in magnesium.

Name 

The name Popocatépetl comes from the Nahuatl words  "it smokes" and   "mountain", meaning Smoking Mountain. The volcano is also referred to by Mexicans as El Popo affectionately, or to shorten the full name.  The alternate nickname Don Goyo comes from the mountain's association in the lore of the region with San Gregorio, "Goyo" being a nickname-like short form of Gregorio. The name was extended by those who lived in Santiago Xalitzina, a small community that resided 12 km from the volcano. Legend says that many years ago, a villager met an old man on the slopes of the mountain, who introduced himself as Gregorio Chino Popocatépetl. Gregorio was a personification of the spirit of the volcano, and communicates with the locals to warn them if an eruption is about to happen. Thus, every March 12, the day of San Gregorio, the locals bring flowers and food to the volcano to celebrate the saint.

Geology 
The generally symmetrical volcano is modified by the sharp-peaked Ventorrillo on the NW, a remnant of an earlier volcano. At least three previous major cones were destroyed by gravitational failure during the Pleistocene, producing massive debris avalanche deposits covering broad areas south of the volcano. The modern volcano was constructed to the south of the late-Pleistocene to Holocene El Fraile cone. Three major Plinian eruptions, the most recent of which took place about 800 AD, have occurred from Popocatépetl since the mid-Holocene, accompanied by pyroclastic flows and voluminous lahars that swept basins below the volcano.

According to paleomagnetic studies, the volcano is about 730,000 years old. The crater is elliptical with an orientation northeast-southwest. Popocatépetl is currently active after being dormant for about half of last century. Its activity increased in 1991 and smoke has been seen constantly emanating from the crater since 1993. The volcano is monitored by the Deep Earth Carbon Degassing Project.

History 
The geological history of Popocatépetl began with the formation of the ancestral volcano Nexpayantla. About 200,000 years ago, Nexpayantla collapsed in an eruption, leaving a caldera, in which the next volcano, known as El Fraile, began to form. Another eruption about 50,000 years ago caused that to collapse, and Popocatépetl rose from that. The debris field from that is one of four around the volcano, and it is also the youngest.

Three Plinian eruptions are known to have taken place: 3,000 years ago (3195–2830 BC), 2,150 years ago (800–215 BC), and 1,100 years ago (likely 823 AD). The latter two buried the nearby village of Tetimpa, preserving evidence of preclassical culture.

The first recorded European ascent of the volcano was made by an expedition led by Diego de Ordaz in 1519. The early-16th-century monasteries on the slopes of the mountain are a World Heritage Site.

Eruptions 

Popocatépetl is one of the most active volcanoes in Mexico and the most famous, having had more than 15 major eruptions since the arrival of the Spanish in 1519.

Timeline
 Mid-to late first century: A violent VEI-6 eruption may have caused the large migrations that settled Teotihuacan, according to DNA analysis of teeth and bones.
 Eruptions were observed in 1363, 1509, 1512, 1519–1528, 1530, 1539, 1540, 1548, 1562–1570, 1571, 1592, 1642, 1663, 1664, 1665, 1697, 1720, 1802, 1919, 1923, 1925, and 1933.
 1947: A major eruption.
The activity prompted the evacuation of nearby towns and scientists to begin monitoring for an eruption.
 December 2000: Tens of thousands of people were evacuated by the government, based on the warnings of scientists. The volcano then made its largest display in 1,200 years.
 25 December 2005: The volcano's crater produced an explosion which ejected a large column of smoke and ash about  into the atmosphere and expulsion of lava.
 January and February 2012: Scientists observed increased volcanic activity at Popocatépetl. On January 25, 2012, an ash explosion occurred on the mountain, causing much dust and ash to contaminate the atmosphere around it.
 15 April 2012: Reports of superheated rock fragments being hurled into the air by the volcano. Ash and water vapor plumes were reported 15 times over 24 hours.
 Wednesday 8 May 2013, at 7:28 p.m. local time: Popocatépetl erupted again with a high amplitude tremor that lasted and was recorded for 3.5 hours. It began with plumes of ash that rose  into the air and began drifting west at first, but later began to drift east-southeast, covering areas of the villages of San Juan Tianguismanalco, San Pedro Benito Juárez and the City of Puebla in smoke and ash.
 July 4, 2013: Due to several eruptions of steam and ash for at least 24 hours, at least six U.S. airlines canceled more than 40 flights into and out of Mexico City International Airport and Toluca International Airport that day.
 27 August–September 2014: CENAPRED reported explosions, accompanied by steam-and-gas emissions with minor ash and ash plumes that rose 800-3,000 m above Popocatépetl's crater and drifted west, southwest, and west-southwest. On most nights incandescence was observed, increasing during times with larger emissions.
 1 September 2014: Partial visibility due to cloud cover.
 29 and 31 August 2014: The Washington Volcanic Ash Advisory Center (VAAC) reported discrete ash emissions.
 7 January 2015: CENAPRED reported that ash from recent explosions coats the snow on the volcano's upper slopes.
 3 April 2016: Popocatépetl erupted, spewing lava, ash and rock.
 August 2016: Eruptions continued, with four discrete blasts on August 17.
 10 November 2017 at 7:25 local time, eruption continued.
 15 December 2018 at 18:57 local time, spewing lava, ash and rock.
 19 March 2019 21:38 local time, fragments of the dome shot within  radius. Due to continuing activity, on March 28 2019, based on the analysis of the available information, the Scientific Advisory Committee of the Popocatépetl volcano recommended changing the phase of the Yellow Volcanic Warning Light Phase 2 to Yellow Phase 3, which is a preventive measure against the observed changes.
 June 3, 2019 Popocatépetl continued its explosive uptick by firing an ash column to approximately  a.s.l.
 June 24, 2019 Popocatépetl erupted once more, sending a massive ash cloud some kilometres (thousands of feet) into the air.
 July 18, 2019 Popocatépetl erupts three times, sending ashes  into the air each time.
 July 20, 2019, volcanic ash is reported in Xochimilco after the morning's eruption.
 October 2019, the volcano erupted multiple times in one night.
 November 2019, an eruption partially forced a KLM flight from Amsterdam to Mexico City to turn back.
 January 27. 2020 Popocatépetl erupted in a sensational nighttime display of rock and ash.
 February 5, 2020 Popocatépetl had a moderate explosion producing an ash plume that went up 1.5 km. Had more explosions on February 15, 18, and 22 having ash plumes rising that ranged from 400- 1,200 m.
 December 19, 2022  Popocatépetl emitted materials up to one kilometer high

In literature and art 
In the poem Romance ("Chimborazo, Cotopaxi....Popocatapetl")  by Walter J. Turner (1916), Cotopaxi is one of the romantic locations that has stolen the poet's heart.

Popocatépetl and Iztaccíhuatl feature prominently in Malcolm Lowry’s 1947 novel Under the Volcano as well as the novel’s 1984 US drama film adaptation directed by John Huston.

The legend of the two volcanos feature as the central story in Duncan Tonatiuh's children's book The Princess and the Warrior: A Tale of Two Volcanoes.

In visual arts, Popocatépetl is the subject of Marsden Hartley’s 1932 painting Popocatepetl, Spirited Morning--Mexico, now at the Smithsonian American Art Museum in Washington, D.C.

Several works by Dr. Atl feature Popocatépetl, among them his 1928 Self-Portrait with Popocatépetl, now in the Philadelphia Museum of Art and his 1942 The Shadow of Popo, now in the Museo Nacional de Arte in Mexico City.

Popocatépetl also features prominently in the Juan Manuel Martinez Caltenco mural on the upper floor Municipal Palace of Atlixco, Puebla. The murals cover much of the palace’s interior and represent an important Poblano contribution to the Mexican muralism movement.

Jesús Helguera’s 1940 masterpiece La Leyenda de los Volcanes in Chicago’s National Museum of Mexican Art depicts the myth of Popocatépetl and Iztaccíhuatl.

The 1966 Warner Brothers cartoon Snow Excuse is set above the snow line on Popocatépetl.

The band Pop-a-Cat-a-Petal (later Ultrasound) were named after a mondegreen of Popocatépetl.

Gallery

See also 

List of volcanoes in Mexico
List of Ultras of Mexico
Legend of Popocatépetl and Iztaccíhuatl, pre-Hispanic legends on the origin of the two mountains 
1949 Mexicana DC-3 crash which took place on this volcano

Notes

References

Further reading

External links 

 National Geographic News
 Live webcam of Popocatepetl

Active volcanoes
Mountains of Mexico
Stratovolcanoes of Mexico
Trans-Mexican Volcanic Belt
Landforms of the State of Mexico
Landforms of Morelos
Landforms of Puebla
Pleistocene stratovolcanoes
Pleistocene North America
Quaternary Mexico
Subduction volcanoes
VEI-6 volcanoes
World Heritage Sites in Mexico
Geography of Mesoamerica
Locations in Aztec mythology
Locations in Mesoamerican mythology
North American 5000 m summits
Volcanoes of the State of Mexico
Volcanoes of Morelos
Volcanoes of Puebla
Holocene stratovolcanoes